In the mathematical branch of topology, a hyperspace (or a space equipped with a hypertopology) is a topological space, which consists of  the set CL(X) of all closed subsets of another topological space X, equipped with a topology so that the canonical map

is a homeomorphism onto its image. As a consequence, a copy of the original space X lives inside its hyperspace CL(X).  

Early examples of hypertopology include the Hausdorff metric and Vietoris topology.

See also
 Hausdorff distance
 Kuratowski convergence
 Wijsman convergence

References

External links 
Comparison of Hypertopologies
Hyperspacewiki

Topology